The Avro Blue Steel was a British air-launched, rocket-propelled nuclear armed standoff missile, built to arm the V bomber force. It allowed the bomber to launch the missile against its target while still outside the range of surface-to-air missiles (SAMs). The missile proceeded to the target at speeds up to Mach 3, and would trigger within 100 m of the pre-defined target point.

Blue Steel entered service in 1963, by which point improved SAMs with longer range had greatly eroded the advantages of the design. A longer-range version, Blue Steel II, was considered, but cancelled in favour of the much longer-range GAM-87 Skybolt system from the US. When development of that system was cancelled in 1962, the V-bomber fleet was considered highly vulnerable. Blue Steel remained the primary British nuclear deterrent weapon until the Royal Navy started operating Polaris ballistic missiles from Resolution-class submarines.

Development

Blue Steel was the result of a Ministry of Supply memorandum from 5 November 1954 that predicted that by 1960 Soviet air defences would make it impossible for V bombers to attack with nuclear gravity bombs. The answer was for a rocket-powered, supersonic missile capable of carrying a large nuclear (or projected thermonuclear) warhead with a range of at least . This would keep the bombers out of range of Soviet ground-based defences installed around the target area, allowing the missile to "dash" in at high speed.

There would have to be a balance between the size of the warhead, the need for it to be carried by any of the three V-bomber types in use, and that it should be able to reach Mach 3. At the time the only strategic warhead available in the UK was the Green Bamboo, which was very large and so required a large missile fuselage to carry it. The Air Staff issued this requirement for a stand-off bomb as OR.1132 in September 1954.

The Ministry of Supply selected Avro out of the British manufacturers, although it had no experience in working on guided weapons other than some private venture work; Handley Page had suggested a  missile, but the Elliots gyro based guidance system was inaccurate beyond . Avro began work proper in 1955, with the assigned Rainbow Code name of "Blue Steel" which it would keep in service. With Elliots working on the guidance system, Armstrong Siddeley would develop the liquid fuel engine. The design period was protracted, with various development problems exacerbated by the fact that designers lacked information on the actual size and weight of the proposed boosted fission warhead Green Bamboo, or its likely thermonuclear successor derived from the Granite series. The large girth of Blue Steel was determined by the  implosion sphere diameter of Green Bamboo.

Avro proposed that Blue Steel would evolve over time, subsequent versions increasing speed (to Mach 4.5) and range. The ultimate Blue Steel would be a  range weapon that could be launched by the supersonic Avro 730 under development. They were told to limit themselves to the specification of OR.1132. The project was delayed by the need to develop the required stainless steel fabrication techniques; this would have been gained in building the Avro 730 but that had been cancelled by then. The Elliots guidance system was plagued by accuracy problems, delaying test flights.

As it turned out, neither of the originally-proposed UK-designed warheads were actually fitted, being superseded by Red Snow, an Anglicised variant of the U.S. W-28 thermonuclear warhead of 1.1 Mt yield. Red Snow was smaller and lighter than the earlier warhead proposals. The missile was fitted with a state-of-the-art inertial navigation unit. This system allowed the missile to strike within 100 metres of its designated target. In addition, the pilots of the Avro Vulcan or Handley Page Victor bombers could tie their systems into those of the missile and make use of the guidance system to help plot their own flight plan, since the unit in the missile was more advanced than that in the aircraft.

Blue Steel emerged as a pilotless, winged aircraft roughly the size of the experimental Saunders-Roe SR.53 interceptor, with clipped delta wings and small canard foreplanes. It was powered by a two-chamber Armstrong Siddeley Stentor Mark 101 rocket engine, burning a combination of hydrogen peroxide and kerosene. The fuel was a considerable operational problem, because fuelling the missile before launch took nearly half an hour, and was quite hazardous.  It required the fuelling site to be flooded with water, and (during the trials campaigns) very early morning preparations because of the heat experienced during Australian summer. Another issue was the very small ground clearance when attached to the Handley Page Victor, and Victor aircrews were especially aware of the dangers when taking off.  (The Vulcan had a much higher ground clearance, and ultimately proved a better platform).

On launch the rocket engine's first chamber developing  thrust would power the missile along a predetermined course to the target at around Mach 1.5. Once close to the target, the second chamber of the engine (6,000 lb) would accelerate the missile to Mach 3. Over the target the engine would cut out and the missile would free-fall before detonating its warhead as an air burst.

To speed the trials at Woomera, the test rounds were flown there by Victors and Vulcans in Operation Blue Ranger. The trials began in 1960 about the time the original requirement expected the weapon to be in service.  The missiles were prepared at the Weapons Research Establishment near Salisbury South Australia, and flown to be launched at the Woomera range from RAAF Edinburgh. A specialist RAF unit, 4 JSTU, was established to carry out preparatory and operational tasks.

Blue Steel finally entered service in February 1963, carried by Vulcans and Victors, although its limitations were already apparent. The short range of the missile meant that the V bombers were still vulnerable to enemy surface-to-air missiles. A replacement for Blue Steel, the Mark 2, was planned with increased range and a ramjet engine, but was cancelled in 1960 to minimise delays to the Mk.1. The UK sought to acquire the much longer-ranged United States Air Force AGM-48 Skybolt air-launched ballistic missile, and was greatly frustrated when that weapon was cancelled in late 1962.

Blue Steel required up to seven hours of launch preparation, and was highly unreliable. The Royal Air Force estimated in 1963 that half the missiles would fail to fire and would have to be dropped over their targets, contradicting their purpose of serving as standoff weapons. Even as it deployed Blue Steel, a high-altitude weapon, that year the government decided that because of anti-aircraft missiles' increasing effectiveness, V bombers would have to convert from high-altitude to low-altitude attacks. A stop-gap weapon (WE.177B) was quickly produced to extend the life of the V-bomber force in the strategic role until the Polaris missile was deployed. One live operational round was deployed on each of forty-eight Vulcan and Victor bombers, and a further five live rounds were produced as operational spares. An additional four non-nuclear rounds were produced for various RAF requirements, and there were sixteen other unspecified training rounds.

Blue Steel was officially retired on 31 December 1970, with the United Kingdom's strategic nuclear capacity passing to the submarine fleet.

Operator
 
 Royal Air Force - (V bombers)

Specifications
 Length: 
 Wingspan: 
 Diameter: 1.22 m (48 in) minimum
 Launch Weight: 
 Speed: Mach 2.3
 Ceiling: 
 Maximum Range: 
 Guidance: Inertial
 CEP: ~100 metres
 Warhead: Red Snow thermonuclear (1.1 Mt)

See also
AGM-28 Hound Dog
Raduga Kh-22
Rainbow Codes

Notes

Bibliography
 Leitch, Andy. "V-Force Arsenal: Weapons for the Valiant, Victor and Vulcan". Air Enthusiast No. 107, September/October 2003. pp. 52–59.

External links

Video of Blue Steel in operation
Blue Steel
https://web.archive.org/web/20040208232113/http://www.skomer.u-net.com/projects/bluesteel.htm
Official history: RAF Nuclear Deterrent Forces: Author: Wynne. pps 201. 456. . Publisher: HMSO, 1994.
http://www.globalsecurity.org/wmd/world/uk/blue_steel.htm
https://web.archive.org/web/20061209210406/http://www.vectorsite.net/twcruz.html
The Vulcan Gets New Striking Power an AVRO advertisement for the Vulcan from Flight in February 1959, showing the (still unnamed) Blue Steel.
"Blue Steel And Its Engine" a 1960 Flight article on the Blue Steel

Cold War air-to-surface missiles of the United Kingdom
Nuclear air-to-surface missiles
Nuclear weapons of the United Kingdom
Military equipment introduced in the 1960s